Peter Lehmann (born January 28, 1946) is a retired Swiss professional ice hockey player who played for SCL Tigers in the National League A.  He also represented the Swiss national team at the 1972 Winter Olympics.

References

External links
Peter Lehmann's stats at Sports-Reference.com

1946 births
Living people
Ice hockey players at the 1972 Winter Olympics
Olympic ice hockey players of Switzerland
SCL Tigers players
Swiss ice hockey defencemen